The Men's 20 kilometres walk event at the 2011 World Championships in Athletics was held on August 28 on a loop course starting and finishing at Gukchae-bosang Memorial Park in the center of Daegu. Forty-six men started the competition and 27 countries were represented.

Valeriy Borchin entered as the reigning world and 2008 Olympic champion. The athletes on the Chinese and Russian teams led the rankings that year: Wang Zhen and Chu Yafei were the top two, while Borchin, world record holder Vladimir Kanaykin, and Sergey Morozov were in the top six. Wang Hao, Eder Sánchez and Jared Tallent had also performed well that year, as had Kim Hyun-sub, who represented the host nation.

Italian Giorgio Rubino and Japan's Yusuke Suzuki were the early leaders after 5 km. The two remained half a minute ahead at 10 km, but Rubino fell off the pace and was later disqualified for lifting both feet off the ground. Borchin and Wang Zhen made up ground on Suzuki and after 15 km Borchin progressively pulled away to win the race and defend his title.

In the last 5 km Vladimir Kanaykin and Luis Fernando López finished quickly to came away with the silver and bronze medals, respectively. Wang Zhen held on for fourth, with  Stanislav Emelyanov fifth kKim Hyun-sub sixth.

At the time, Borchin became only the third walker to win consecutive 20 km world titles, joining Maurizio Damilano and Jefferson Pérez. Although his winning time was not especially quick, the race was undertaken in hot and humid conditions.

On 20 January 2015, Borchin was suspended for eight years from 15 October 2012, with his results between 14 July 2009 and 15 October 2012 (including his 2009 and 2011 World Championship gold medals) being deleted from the records. On the same day, Kanaykin was suspended for life starting from 17 December 2012, with all of his results between 11 February 2011 to 17 December 2012 (including his 2011 world Championship silver medal) being deleted from the records.

López was therefore declared the 2011 World Champion, with his gold medal being Colombia's first ever medal in the history of the Championships, while Wang Zhen was promoted to silver.

Stanislav Yemelyanov of Russia was originally promoted to the bronze medal, but he was suspended for eight years for a second doping offence from 7 April 2017, with all of his results from 2 June 2009 being deleted from the records (including these championships); this suspension was made indefinite on 2 June 2018.

Accordingly, the IAAF  informed the Korea Association of Athletics Federations (KAAF) that Kim would be awarded the bronze medal, South Korea's first ever at these Championships.

Medalists

Records

Qualification standards

Schedule

Results

Final

References

External links
20 kilometres walk results at IAAF website
20 kilometres race walk men result at IAAF website

Walk 20
Racewalking at the World Athletics Championships